County Road 340 is a  road in the municipality of Rindal in Møre og Romsdal County, Norway. It runs between Bolmen, where it branches off from County Road 65, and Bjørnåsen, where it rejoins County Road 65. The road initially runs east, crossing the Rinda River, to the junction with County Road 341, and then turns north, running through Rindal, and then past Igletjønna ('Leech Lake', named for the leeches formerly found there), across Gjø or Jø Creek (Gjøåa, Jøåa) near its confluence with Askjell Creek (Askjellsåa), and past the junction with County Road 342. Various proposals are in the works for naming local segments of the road (e.g., Rindalsvegen 'Rindal Road', Mjohølvegen 'Mjohøl Road', etc.).

References

External links
Statens vegvesen – trafikkmeldinger Fv341 (Traffic Information: County Road 340)

340
Rindal